Iso-Nuoramo is a lake in Ähtäri, Finland. It has a surface area with about 0.13 square kilometres. Iso-Nuoramo is the most northern and clearly the largest of group of three Nuoramo lakes in Ähtäri; the others are Keskimmäinen-Nuoramo and Pieni-Nuoramo.

References

External links

Lakes of Ähtäri